This is the complete list of Asian Games medalists in canoeing from 1990 to 2018.

Slalom

Men

C-1

C-2

K-1

Women

C-1

K-1

Sprint

Men

C-1 200 m

C-1 500 m

C-1 1000 m

C-2 200 m

C-2 500 m

C-2 1000 m

K-1 200 m

K-1 500 m

K-1 1000 m

K-2 200 m

K-2 500 m

K-2 1000 m

K-4 500 m

K-4 1000 m

Women

C-1 200 m

C-2 500 m

K-1 200 m

K-1 500 m

K-2 500 m

K-4 500 m

References 

Medalists from previous Asian Games – Men – C1 & C2
Medalists from previous Asian Games – Men – K1 & K2
Medalists from previous Asian Games – Men – K4
Medalists from previous Asian Games – Men – Discontinued
Medalists from previous Asian Games – Women – K1 & K2
Medalists from previous Asian Games – Women – K4

External links 
 Asian Canoe Confederation

Canoeing
medalists